Roelof Koops (19 July 1909 – 7 June 2008) was a Dutch speed skater who competed in the 1936 Winter Olympics.

He was born in Zuidlaren and died in Veendam.

In 1936 he finished 13th in the 5000 metres event, 17th in the 10000 metres competition, and 30th in the 1500 metres event.

External links
 
 Speed skating 1936 

1909 births
2008 deaths
People from Tynaarlo
Dutch male speed skaters
Olympic speed skaters of the Netherlands
Speed skaters at the 1936 Winter Olympics
People from Zuidlaren
Sportspeople from Drenthe